Dalya Attar-Mehrzadi is an American politician who currently serves in the Maryland House of Delegates. Delegate Attar represents the 41st Legislative District of the state of Maryland, which is located in northwest Baltimore City.

Biography

Early years
Attar was born and raised in Baltimore City in a working-class immigrant family. She is a Sephardi Orthodox Jew born to an Iranian-Jewish father and a Moroccan-Jewish mother. She studied at a Bais Yaakov School for Girls.

Career
In 2011 she graduated from the University of Baltimore earning a Bachelor of Criminal Justice degree. In 2014, three years later, she graduated from the Francis King Carey School of Law at the University of Maryland. Afterward, she worked as a prosecutor at the Baltimore State's Attorney office.

On November 4, 2018, Attar became the first Orthodox Jew elected to the Maryland House of Delegates and the highest-ranking Orthodox Jewish woman in American history. Along with Cheryl Kagan, Attar has co-sponsored legislation to help agunot women by preventing a husband from having a civil divorce unless they grant their wife a get.

Family

Attar is the fourth of six siblings, is married to Asaf Mehrzadi, and they have two children together, Ilana, and Aaron.

Notes

1990 births
21st-century American Jews
21st-century American politicians
21st-century American women politicians
American feminists
American Sephardic Jews
American Mizrahi Jews
American people of Iranian-Jewish descent
American people of Moroccan-Jewish descent
American politicians of Iranian descent
American politicians of Moroccan descent
Jewish American state legislators in Maryland
Jewish women politicians
Living people
Democratic Party members of the Maryland House of Delegates
Mizrahi feminists
Sephardi politicians
Women state legislators in Maryland